The BTT3 Banshee, formerly the Target Technology Banshee & Meggitt Banshee, is a British target drone developed in the 1980s for air defence systems training.

Design and development
The Banshee was developed by Target Technology Ltd. The company had been specialising in lightweight engines for drones and had developed its own design in 1983.

Banshee is a built mostly out of composite material (Kevlar and glass-reinforced plastic) with a tailless delta wing planform. The first models used a 26 hp 342 cc Normalair-Garrett two-cylinder two-stroke driving a pusher propeller. Flight control is by two elevons.

Later models used Norton P73 rotary engines

Operational history
Banshee entered service with the British Army in the mid-1980s as an aerial target for the Short Blowpipe and Javelin shoulder-launched missiles.

Banshee has been deployed in over 40 Countries. It has been tested against Blowpipe, Chaparral, Crotale, Javelin, Phalanx, Rapier, Hisar (including Hisar O+ and Siper), Sea Sparrow, QRSAM, Akash SAM and Barak 8 SAM systems.

Operators
 

 Operated by the Inter Service Drone Section

Variants
Banshee 300 - (1988)
Banshee 400 - Reconnaissance (2001)
Banshee 500 - First model to include all epoxy based composite construction
Banshee 600 - Evolution of the 500 variant
Banshee Jet 40 - Single turbine
Banshee Jet 80 - Twin turbine

Banshee Whirlwind

Specifications Meggitt BTT-3 Banshee

On Display 

 Serial 1364 - Science Museum, London
 Serial 3088 - City of Norwich Aviation Museum

See also

References

Banshee
1980s British special-purpose aircraft
Target drones of the United Kingdom
Single-engined pusher aircraft
Wankel-engined aircraft
Tailless delta-wing aircraft